Alfred Collins Converse (March 17, 1827 – April 26, 1915) was a Massachusetts businessman and politician who served as the eighteenth Mayor of Chelsea, Massachusetts.

Biography
Alfred C. Converse was born in Rindge, New Hampshire on March 17, 1827.

He served as mayor of Chelsea, Massachusetts from 1892 to 1893.

He died in East Rindge, New Hampshire on April 26, 1915.

References

External links
 Mayors of Chelsea 1857 – 1991
 

1827 births
1915 deaths
Businesspeople from Massachusetts
Mayors of Chelsea, Massachusetts
19th-century American politicians
People from Rindge, New Hampshire
Mayors of places in Massachusetts
19th-century American businesspeople